The yellow-billed cacique (Amblycercus holosericeus) is a species of cacique in the family Icteridae. It is monotypic within the genus Amblycercus. There is some question as to whether or not it is a true cacique.

The plumage is entirely black. The legs and feet are dark gray. The eye is yellow or yellow-orange. The bill is yellow with a gray tinge.

It is found in Belize, Bolivia, Colombia, Costa Rica, Ecuador, El Salvador, Guatemala, Honduras, Mexico, Nicaragua, Panama, Peru, and Venezuela.

Three subspecies are known:
 A. h. holosericeus – (Deppe, 1830): nominate, found from southeastern Mexico to northwestern Colombia
 A. h. flavirostris – Chapman, 1915: found from western Colombia to northern Peru
 A. h. australis – Chapman, 1919: found in northern Colombia and northwestern Venezuela to eastern Peru and northern Bolivia

Its natural habitats are subtropical or tropical moist lowland forests, subtropical or tropical moist montane forests, and heavily degraded former forest.

The yellow-billed cacique feeds on insects and other invertebrates, as well as some fruit. It uses a pecking technique similar to that of a woodpecker to gain access to the interior of branches and bamboo. In some areas, this species is a bamboo specialist, while in other areas, it feeds from a variety of vegetation.

In the spring, the yellow-billed cacique builds a sturdy cup-shaped nest, which is unusual for its family, who tend to build hanging woven nests.

References

Further reading

External links

 Yellow-billed cacique image at [The Animal Diversity Web (online) http://animaldiversity.org]
 
 
 
 
 
 

yellow-billed cacique
Birds of Central America
Birds of the Yucatán Peninsula
Birds of Colombia
Birds of Venezuela
Birds of Ecuador
Birds of the Yungas
yellow-billed cacique
yellow-billed cacique
Taxonomy articles created by Polbot